Anarsia ulneongensis is a moth in the family Gelechiidae. It was described by Kyu-Tek Park and Margarita Gennadievna Ponomarenko in 1996. It is found in Korea and Japan (Kyushu, Ryukyus).

The length of the forewings is 4.8-6.5 mm for males and 5.4-6.3 mm for females. The forewings are whitish, irregularly tinged with pale fuscous, scattered with blackish scales. There is blackish dot at the base of the costa, and two small fuscous marks on one-fourth and one-third. The hindwings are pale brownish grey, with the veins slightly darker.

References

ulneongensis
Moths described in 1996
Moths of Korea
Moths of Japan